Responsible Citizen is a 2019 Burmese political action film, directed by Steel (Dwe Myittar) starring Nay Toe, Min Maw Kun, Htun Htun, Nay Htet Lin, Nay Myo Aung, Zin Wine, Min Thway, Si Phyo, Moe Yan Zun, Htun Ko Ko, Shwe Thamee and Awn Seng. The film, produced by Arr Man Production premiered Myanmar on August 8, 2019.

Plot 

A police officer daring to confront and launched investigation the corrupt politicians and their sons who committed rape of model that cause their downfall from power.

Filming 

Principal photography began in June 2018.

Cast
Nay Toe as Deputy Police Commissioner Ye Thiha
Min Maw Kun as Kaung Tayza
Htun Htun as Police Officer Thura Zaw
Nay Htet Lin as U Min Maung
Nay Myo Aung as U Htut Tin
Zin Wine as U Kaung Myat
Min Thway as Nay Min Thurain
Nay Ye as Htut Myat Min
Shwe Thamee as Chit Su
Awn Seng as Saw Yu Nwe
Si Phyo
Moe Yan Zun
Htun Ko Ko
Htoo Char
Thein Lin Soe
Sara Saung Oo
Maung Thi

References

2019 films
2010s Burmese-language films
Burmese action films
Films shot in Myanmar
2019 action films